Jake Carter (born Jacob Carter; 11 August 1998) is a singer and the winner of series 2 of the Irish television dance competition Dancing with the Stars. He is the younger brother of country music singer Nathan Carter.

Career 
In 2017, Carter burst on to the Irish music scene after a performance on The Late Late Show with Ryan Tubridy, performing his first single, "Trouble". The single accompanied with a music video received a lot of air play on Irish country music radio stations and reached number one on the Irish Country Music iTunes chart.

He followed up "Trouble" with an EP titled Three Things.

Appearances

Aladdin
In December 2017, Carter appeared as the title character Aladdin in the Belfast SSE Arena pantomime production of Aladdin.

Dancing with the Stars 
In December 2017, Carter was confirmed as one of the eleven celebrities taking part in the second series of the Irish version of Dancing with the Stars.

Carter was paired with Irish professional dancer, Karen Byrne for the series. They won the competition on 25 March 2018.

 Dancing with the Stars performances

Personal life 
Carter was born to Ian and Noreen In 1998. He is the younger brother of Irish Country singer Nathan Carter. Carter has toured extensively with his brother, most recently supporting him on Irish arena tour in March 2018. He also has a sister, Kiara Carter. Since 2018, Carter has been in a relationship with his Dancing with the Stars professional partner, Karen Byrne.

Discography

EPs
2017: Three Things
1. "Just Wanna Kiss You" (3:02) - 2. "Wild and Free" (3:22) 3. "Havin' a Party" (3:04) 4. "I Ain't Ever Coming Down" (3:05) 5. "Fallin' for You" (2:57)

Singles / videography
2016: "Trouble"
2017: "Wild and Free"
2017: "Havin' a Party"
2017: "I Just Wanna Kiss You"
2018: "Fallin' for You"
2018: "The Little Things You Do"
2018: "2018"
2018: "Take Me Dancing" (feat. Una Healy)
2019: “Supernatural”
2019: "I Won't be Leaving"

References

External links

1998 births
Living people
Country singers from Northern Ireland
Male singers from Northern Ireland
Musicians from Liverpool
Dancing with the Stars winners